The Zirka Dnipra (formerly Marshal Rybalko) is a Dmitriy Furmanov-class (project 302, BiFa129M) Soviet/Ukrainian river cruise ship, cruising in the Dnepr – Black Sea basin. The ship was built by VEB Elbewerften Boizenburg/Roßlau at their shipyard in Boizenburg, East Germany, and entered service in 1988.  Her home port is currently Kherson. Zirka Dnipra captain (2012) is Vladimir Bilenko.

Features
The ship has two restaurants: Odessa restaurant (84 places) on the Boat deck and Kyiv restaurant (176 places) on the Upper deck, two bars:  Odessa Bar (84 places, Boat deck) and Panorama Bar (50 places, Boat deck), the lounge on the Upper deck, conference hall (for up to 220 people) and souvenir shop.

See also
 List of river cruise ships

References

External links

Теплоход "Звезда Днепра" 

1988 ships
River cruise ships